Robert Clayton Robbins (born November 20, 1957), known professionally as Robert C. Robbins or R.C. Robbins, is an American cardiothoracic surgeon and the 22nd and current president of The University of Arizona. Previously, he was the president and CEO of the Texas Medical Center in Houston, Texas, from 2012 to 2017. As an internationally recognized cardiac surgeon, he has focused his clinical efforts on acquired cardiac diseases, including surgical treatment of congestive heart failure and cardiothoracic transplantation. He also serves on the board of the Greater Phoenix Economic Council.

Early life
Robbins was born in Laurel, Mississippi, and raised by his maternal grandparents, where he spent much of his childhood at the local community college, where his grandfather was a math professor. In high school, Robbins was inspired to pursue medicine, in part due to the lack of local physicians. He later earned his first undergraduate degree in Chemistry from Millsaps College. In 1983, he received his medical degree from the University of Mississippi.

Career 
After receiving his medical degree in 1983, he continued work as a resident at the University of Mississippi until 1989, with an emphasis in general surgery. He then began a residency at Stanford University Hospital, specializing in cardiothoracic surgery until 1992, before working as a pediatric fellow at Emory University School of Medicine and Royal Children's Hospital in Australia. Beginning in 1993, Robbins acted as the director of the cardiothoracic transplantation laboratory at the Stanford University School of Medicine until 2012, becoming the chair of the Department of Cardiothoracic Surgery in 2005. During his time at the Stanford University School of Medicine, Robbins maintained active roles in a variety of public and professional service, including serving on the education committee for the American Association for Thoracic Surgery and the strategic planning committee for the American Heart Association.

On November 5, 2012, Robbins left Stanford's school of medicine to work as the president and CEO of the Texas Medical Center, before becoming the 22nd president of the University of Arizona in 2017.

Publications 
Robbin's publications include more than 300 peer-reviewed journal articles, spanning a variety of research topics including the investigation of stem cells for cardiac regeneration, cardiac transplant allograft vasculopathy, bioengineered blood vessels, and automated vascular anastomotic devices.

Selected publications 

 Haematopoietic stem cells adopt mature haematopoietic fates in ischaemic myocardium (2004)
 Bridge-to-transplant with the Novacor left-ventricular assist system (1999)

References

1957 births
Living people
Presidents of the University of Arizona
American thoracic surgeons